The Australian cricket team toured England in the 1956 season to play a five-match Test series against England for The Ashes.

England won the series 2–1 with 2 matches drawn and therefore retained The Ashes.

The series is most notable for off-spinner Jim Laker's 46 wickets (a record for a 5-Test series) at an average of 9.60, including all ten wickets in the second innings of the fourth Test at Old Trafford, the first time this had been achieved in Test cricket. In that Test, known as Laker's Match, Laker took 19 wickets for 90 runs, still the best match bowling analysis achieved in both Test and all first-class cricket. The cartoonist Roy Ullyett summed up the summer with the picture of a dazed kangaroo in Australian strip and the ditty: Here lie the Ashes of '56, skittled by Laker for next to nix. Never forgotten, sorry you thought our wicket rotten, signed "Love from the groundstaff". The second line refers to the Australian complaints that the grass had been shaved off the Old Trafford wicket to help the England spinners. Earlier in the summer, Laker had also taken ten wickets in an innings against the Australians in a tour match, playing for Surrey.

Test series

1st Test

2nd Test

3rd Test

4th Test

5th Test

References

Annual reviews
 Playfair Cricket Annual 1957
 Wisden Cricketers' Almanack 1957

Further reading
 Bill Frindall, The Wisden Book of Test Cricket 1877-1978, Wisden, 1979
 Chris Harte, A History of Australian Cricket, Andre Deutsch, 1993
 Ray Robinson, On Top Down Under, Cassell, 1975

External links
 CricketArchive – tour summaries

1956 in Australian cricket
1956 in English cricket
1956
International cricket competitions from 1945–46 to 1960
1956